Archidendron bigeminum is a tree species in the legume family (Fabaceae). It is found in India and Sri Lanka. It is known as "kalitiya - කලටිය" in Sinhala.

The World Conservation Monitoring Centre (WCMC) in the 1998 IUCN Redlist reviewed Abarema bigemina and Pithecellobium gracile as Vulnerable species. These are nowadays both considered junior synonyms of Archidendron bigeminum. It may be that the Indian population consists of a smaller-growing variety than that on Sri Lanka.

Synonyms
The complete list of junior synonyms is:
 Abarema abeywickramae Kosterm.
 Abarema bigemina (L.) Kosterm.
 Abarema monadelpha (Roxb.) Kosterm.
 Abarema monadelpha (Roxb.) Kosterm. var. gracile (Bedd.) Kosterm.
 Archidendron monadelphum (Roxb.) I.C.Nielsen
 Archidendron monadelphum (Roxb.) I.C.Nielsen var. gracile (Bedd.) Sanjappa
 Inga bigemina (L.) Willd.
 Mimosa bigemina L.
 Mimosa monadelpha Roxb.
 Pithecellobium bigeminum (L.) Mart.
 Pithecellobium bigemium (L.) Mart.
 Pithecellobium gracile Bedd.
 Pithecellobium nicobaricum Prain

References

  (2005): Archidendron bigeminum. Version 10.01, November 2005. Retrieved 2008-MAR-30.

bigeminum
Flora of the Indian subcontinent
Vulnerable plants
Plants described in 1753
Taxa named by Carl Linnaeus